Juricani is a small village in Croatia. It is officially a part of the city of Umag, which is a coastal city in Istria, Croatia.

Demographics 
According to the 2001 census, Juricani has a total population of 413 people. Of this, 194 are male, while the remaining 219 are women.

References

Populated places in Istria County